Proditrix chionochloae is a species of moth in the family Glyphipterigidae. It is endemic to New Zealand.  It is classified as "At Risk, Declining'" by the Department of Conservation.

Taxonomy 
P. chionochloae was described by John S. Dugdale in 1987 using specimens collected by him at the Pouakai Range in Taranaki. The holotype specimen is held in the New Zealand Arthropod Collection.

Description 
Both the male and female adults have wings and their wingspan is 25mm. This moth is similar in appearance to Proditrix megalynta with its buff coloured body and legs but P. chionochloae have a greater number of dark spots on the top of their wings. P. chionochloae can also be distinguished as its genital characteristics are different from P. megalynta and they have a longer third segment of the labial palpi.

Distribution 
This species is endemic to New Zealand. It can only be found in Taupo and Taranaki at the Pouakai Range.

Host plant 

The host plant of this species is Chionochloa rubra.

Conservation status 
This moth is classified under the New Zealand Threat Classification system as being "At Risk, Declining". One of the reasons for this classification is that the host plant of this species is being invaded by heather in Taupo localities.

References

Moths described in 1987
Moths of New Zealand
Plutellidae
Endemic fauna of New Zealand
Endangered biota of New Zealand
Endemic moths of New Zealand